Guillaume Bianchi (born 30 July 1997) is an Italian fencer who won an individual silver medal and a team gold at the 2019 Summer Universiade.

His first podium at the World Cup, was in 2018 in Bonn. He also won the gold team medal at 2018 European Fencing Under 23 Championships.

Biography
Born in Rome, he currently lives in Frascati where he trains at Frascati Scherma. He is studying at Sapienza University of Rome. As a junior, he won individual bronze medal at the 2017 Junior and Cadet World Fencing Championships. He competed at the 2017–18 Fencing World Cup.

Achievements

See also
 Italy at the 2019 Summer Universiade

References

External links
 Guillaume Bianchi at FIE
Pianeta Scherma
Video of his Universiade Final

1997 births
Living people
Italian male fencers
Universiade medalists in fencing
Universiade gold medalists for Italy
Universiade silver medalists for Italy
Universiade bronze medalists for Italy
Fencers from Rome
Fencers at the 2014 Summer Youth Olympics
Fencers of Fiamme Gialle
Medalists at the 2017 Summer Universiade
Medalists at the 2019 Summer Universiade
Mediterranean Games competitors for Italy
Competitors at the 2022 Mediterranean Games
World Fencing Championships medalists